Bazhong Enyang Airport  is an airport serving the city of Bazhong in China's southwestern Sichuan province.

The airport received approval from the State Council and the Central Military Commission of China on 3 July 2014. Construction began on 5 February 2015, and the airport was opened on 3 February 2019, with an inaugural Sichuan Airlines flight from Chengdu. It is operated by Jiuzhai Huanglong Airport Company.

Facilities
Bazhong Airport is a class 4C airport, with a 2,600-meter runway. It is projected to handle 900,000 passengers annually.

Airlines and destinations

See also
List of airports in China
List of the busiest airports in China

References

Airports in Sichuan
Airports established in 2019
2019 establishments in China